KXOA may refer to:

1470 AM (1945–1971 and 1978–1997), now KIID
107.9 FM (1945–1997), which became KDND
93.7 FM (1999–2004), now KYRV